Chanel College is a Catholic boys' secondary school in Coolock, Dublin, Ireland. The Principal is Dara Gill. The college has approximately 600 pupils.

History
The school opened in 1955 with 12 pupils in the first year. It was the year after the canonisation of Saint Peter Chanel (one of the early Marists and the first to be canonised) and so the college was named in his honour. The main part of the school was built in the late sixties. Chanel was the third school to be opened by the Marist Fathers in Ireland, coming after CUS in 1867, and St Mary's College, Dundalk in 1861.

Community involvement
Chanel College has been involved in Civic Link since 2001. In the first year, they were linked to St. Joseph's High School, Derry. Subsequently, they were linked to Knockbreda High School, Belfast and Ballycastle High School, Co. Antrim. They are currently linked with Keithryan High School, Co. Antrim.

Chanel joined the National Foundation for Teaching Entrepreneurship programme in 2006.

Sports facilities
In 2012, Chanel transferred some of its sports fields to neighbouring Parnells GAA club, who built a new sports complex on the site consisting of several floodlit all-weather pitches, training facilities, and a social centre. Chanel has the use of these facilities. It subsequently sold much of its campus to developers, who have built private housing on the approach to the school.

Notable past pupils

 Terence Flanagan, Dublin City Councillor and former TD for Dublin North East (2007-2016)
 Patrick Joseph McGrath, Bishop of San Jose, California (1999-2009)
 Alex White, former TD for Dublin South
 G. V. Wright, former senator and TD

References

External links
 Official website

Coolock
Secondary schools in Dublin (city)
Boys' schools in the Republic of Ireland
Educational institutions established in 1955
1955 establishments in Ireland